John Anthony Stehlin III (pronounced "Stay-lin"; born July 21, 1966), known as Jack Stehlin, is an American television and theater actor who has played the role of DEA Captain Roy Till on the Showtime television series Weeds.

Early life and education
Jack Stehlin was born July 21, 1966 in Allentown, Pennsylvania to John Stehlin, a Minor League Baseball player, and Kitty (née O’Donnell), a circus juggler and acrobat. 

Stehlin's Australian prize fighter great-grandfather turned his ten children into a traveling circus act that joined P. T. Barnum and later the Ringling Brothers in the early 20th century. Stehlin's family includes two family members in the Circus Hall of Fame and the Guinness Book of World Records. He is a great-nephew of Australian Con Colleano, the first wire walker to do a forward somersault on the wire and great nephew of actor Bonar Colleano. 

Stehlin's mother, Kitty, was part of the second generation of Colleanos to join "The Juggling Colleanos," where she performed a juggling and tumbling act with her two brothers and two sisters. Besides traveling the United States with the Ringling Brothers, the Juggling Colleanos were often seen on television shows, including The Ed Sullivan Show and Caesar's Hour.

Stehlin attended the University of South Carolina, initially intending to play college baseball, but he became interested in acting after taking a class on it. He subsequently left the university and moved to New York City, where he attended Juilliard School's drama division as a member of Group 11 (1978–1982). After graduating from Juilliard, Stehlin toured with John Houseman's The Acting Company.

Career

Television
Stehlin has guest starred on several American television programs, often playing tough and witty men of authority. He has appeared in Weeds, Monk, JAG, The Practice, and NYPD Blue. He played the villain on Without a Trace and NCIS. On Buffy the Vampire Slayer, he played the recurring role of Dr. Angelman on Season Four of the program. His additional television appearances include Judging Amy, Crossing Jordan, and ER.

Film
Film roles include Wilde Salomé (2011), The Chicago 8, and Boston Strangler: The Untold Story.

Theater
Stehlin founded a theatre company Circus Theatricals, now based in Los Angeles and renamed The New American Theatre, in 1983, which he now co-manages with his wife Jeannine, an actress and producer he met in 1995. The company's first performance was Chekov’s Uncle Vanya in which Stehlin starred opposite Kevin Spacey and Tom Hewitt.  The theatre company has produced over 50 plays in New York City and Los Angeles, including The Misanthrope, Macbeth, Hamlet, Richard III, True West, The Cheats of Scapin, and others. Stehlin serves as the company's artistic director.

Awards
Stehlin shared a Screen Actor’s Guild (SAG) nomination for "Outstanding Performance by an Ensemble in a Comedy Series". In 2019, he was a recipient of a career achievement award from the arts advocacy organization Stage Raw.

Personal life
Stehlin is married to actress Jeannine Stehlin (née Wisnosky), who is also his producing partner at The New American Theatre.

Filmography

Television
 The Assassination of Gianni Versace: American Crime Story (2018)
 Hieroglyph (2014)
 NCIS: Los Angeles (2011, 1 episode)
 Love Bites (2011, 1 episode)
 The Event (2011, 1 episode)
 Dark Blue (2010, 1 episode)
 Weeds (2006-2009, 18 episodes)
 Monk (2008, 1 episode)
 NCIS (2005, 1 episode)
 Without a Trace (2005, 1 episode)
 The Practice (2004, 1 episode)
 JAG (2003, 3 episodes)
 Strong Medicine (2003, 1 episode)
 Crossing Jordan (2002, 1 episode)
 Buffy the Vampire Slayer (2000, 3 episodes)
 Get Real (2000, 1 episode)
 ER (1999, 1 episode)
 Judging Amy (1999, 1 episode)
 NYPD Blue (1998, 1 episode)
 Blackout Effect (1998, TV movie)
 The Practice (1997, 1 episode)
 General Hospital (1997)
 The Client (1995, 1 episode)
 L.A. Law (1987, 1 episode)

Film
 3 Normandy Lane (2019)
 Salome (2014)
 Wilde Salome (2011)
 The Chicago 8 (2010)
 Boston Strangler: The Untold Story (2008)

References

External links
 Official Website for Jack Stehlin
 

1966 births
Living people
20th-century American male actors
21st-century American male actors
Male actors from Allentown, Pennsylvania
American male film actors
American male stage actors
American male television actors
American people of Australian descent
Juilliard School alumni